Pernell is an unincorporated community in Garvin County, Oklahoma, United States. Pernell had a post office with ZIP code 73076, which opened on June 28, 1922 and closed on December 27, 2003. After the post office closed, Pernell addresses were incorporated with Elmore City. The community was named after resident Thomas Pernell.

References

Unincorporated communities in Garvin County, Oklahoma
Unincorporated communities in Oklahoma